The 2006–07 season was the 108th season in the existence of Olympique Lyonnais and the club's 18th consecutive season in the top flight of French football. They participated in the Ligue 1, the Coupe de France, the Coupe de la Ligue, the Trophée des Champions and UEFA Champions League.

Season summary
Lyon won their sixth consecutive title, becoming the first club from the top five European leagues to win six league titles in a row.

First-team squad
Squad at end of season

Left club during season

Competitions

Overview

Trophée des Champions

Ligue 1

League table

Results summary

Results by match

Matches

Source:

Coupe de France

Coupe de la Ligue

Champions League

Group stage

Knockout phase

Round of 16

Notes and references

Notes

References

Lyon
Olympique Lyonnais seasons
French football championship-winning seasons